Apata District is one of thirty-four districts of the Jauja Province, located at an elevation of 3.340 min the Department of Junin in Peru. It encompasses an area of 421.62 km2. It was elevated to district level in November 16, 1864, during the presidency of José Balta.

Geography 
Some of the highest mountains of the district are listed below:

See also 
 Pumaqucha
 Tipiqucha

References